Blindside is a 1987 Canadian film directed by Paul Lynch and starring Harvey Keitel.

Cast

References

External links
 

1987 films
Canadian thriller drama films
English-language Canadian films
1987 thriller films
Films directed by Paul Lynch
Films scored by Paul Zaza
1980s English-language films
1980s Canadian films